In enzymology, a propionate CoA-transferase is an enzyme that catalyzes the chemical reaction

acetyl-CoA + propanoate  acetate + propanoyl-CoA

Thus, the two substrates of this enzyme are acetyl-CoA and propanoate, whereas its two products are acetate and propanoyl-CoA.

This enzyme belongs to the family of transferases, specifically the CoA-transferases.  The systematic name of this enzyme class is acetyl-CoA:propanoate CoA-transferase. Other names in common use include propionate coenzyme A-transferase, propionate-CoA:lactoyl-CoA transferase, propionyl CoA:acetate CoA transferase, and propionyl-CoA transferase.  This enzyme participates in 3 metabolic pathways: pyruvate metabolism, propanoate metabolism, and styrene degradation.

References

 

EC 2.8.3
Enzymes of unknown structure